Meal Ticket were a country rock band who emerged from the London pub circuit during the 1970s and signed to Logo Records. They had several line ups which included Ray Flacke, Jack Brand, Andy Coulter, Rod Demick, Chris Hunt, Keith Nelson, Steve Simpson, Willy Finlayson and Rick Jones. Canadian born Jones, who was known for his television appearances on Play School and Fingerbobs, wrote many of their songs. The band performed the theme to the BBC's Play For Today, The Flipside of Dominick Hide (1980), also Another Flip for Dominick which was entitled "You'd Better Believe It Babe".
They released three albums, Code Of The Road (1977), Three Times A Day (1977) and Take Away (1978).

Discography

Code of the Road (1977)
Side One
Out of the Blue (4.42) (R Jones / D Pierce / S Hammond) Vocal: Willie Finlayson
Keepin' the Faith (6.26) (R Jones / D Pierce / S Hammond) Vocal: Rick Jones
OK Bar (Same Old Story) (3.47) (R Jones / D Pierce / S Hammond) Vocal Willie Finlayson
Last One to Know (4.31) (S Hammond / R Jones / D Pierce) Vocal: Willie Finlayson 
Day Job (4.23) (R Jones / D Pierce / S Hammond) Vocal: Rick Jones

Side Two
The Man from Mexico (6.47) (R Jones / M Ross) Vocal: Willie Finlayson
Snow (3.17) (R Jones / D Pierce) Vocal: Rick Jones
Golden Girl (4.21) (R Jones / D Pierce / S Hammond) Vocal: Rick Jones; Willy Finlayson; Steve Simpson
Standing on the Wrong Corner (3.24) (R Jones / D Pierce) Vocal: Willie Finlayson
Georgia Syncopator (2.57) (R Jones / D Pierce) Vocal: Rick Jones
The Code of the Road (Travellers Bible) (1.08) (R Jones / D Pierce) Vocal: Rick Jones

Credits
Steve Simpson: Guitar, Harmonica, Keyboards, Fiddle, Mandolin, Vocals
Willy Finlayson: Guitar, Lead Vocals, Electric Keyboard on The Man from Mexico
Rick Jones: Keyboards, Lead Vocals, Guitar on The Code of the Road
Ray Flacke: Guitar, Vocals
Jack Brand: Bass, Vocals
Chris Hunt: Drums and Percussion
Alby Greenhalgh: saxophone on Day Job

Other credits
Produced by Alan O'Duffy with Willy Finlayson
Engineered by Alan O'Duffy
Recorded January 1977 at The Point, London with assists from M Dunn and B Gaylor
Mixed at Advision, London with assists from Declan O'Doherty
Mastered at the Master Room, London
'Out of the Blue' recorded at Pebble Beach Studios, Worthing, August 1976, Produced by Meal Ticket and Tony Platt, engineered by Tony Platt
A Logo Records Production

Three Times A Day (1977)
Side One
This could be the Town (2.36) (B Richardson) Lead Vocal: Willy Finlayson; Guitar solo: Ray Flacke
Oh Sister (3.32) (S Simpson / R Jones) Lead Vocal: Steve Simpson Slide guitar Solo: Ray Flacke
Last Port of Call (5.54) (R Jones / D Pierce) Lead Vocal: Rick Jones Mandolin: Steve Simpson
Comes the Dawn (3.09) (R Jones / D Pierce) Lead Vocal: Willy Finlayson Tenor Saxophone: Don Weller
River Man (5.41) (S Simpson) Lead Vocal: Steve Simpson Dobro: Ray Flacke

Side Two
Yesterday's Music (3.28) (Clayton-Thomas / W Smith) Lead Vocal: Willy Finlayson Guitar Solo: Steve Simpson
Rural Routes (3.18) (D Pierce / R Jones / S Hammond) Lead Vocal: Rick Jones Guitar Solo: Ray Flacke
I Wish, I Wish (3.05) (R Jones / D Pierce) Lead Vocal: Rick Jones and Steve Simpson Guitar Solo: Ray Flacke Banjo: Keith Nelson
Laughing Daughter (4.00) (R Jones / D Pierce) Lead Vocal: Rick Jones
This Dream I Have of You (4.00) (R Jones / D Pierce) Lead Vocal: Willy Finlayson Guitar Solo: Ray Flacke String Arrangement: Ann O'Dell

Credits
Steve Simpson: Lead Vocals, Guitar, Acoustic Guitar, Mandolin, Accordion
Willy Finlayson: Lead Vocals, Guitar
Rick Jones: Lead Vocals, Keyboards
Ray Flacke: Guitar, Acoustic Guitar, DobroVocals
Jack Brand: Bass, Vocals
Chris Hunt: Drums and Percussion

Other credits
Produced by Ritchie Gold / Handle Artists
Recorded and Mixed at Threshold / Decca Studio 1
Engineer Derek Varnals
Assisted by Paul Cooper and Craig Thompson
‘This could be the Town' Recorded at Marquee Studio, Engineer Phil Harding, Mixed at Threshold
‘Yesterday's Music' Recorded and Mixed at Marquee Studio, Engineer John Eden
July and August 1977
Mastered at EMI Abbey Road by Chris Blair
A Logo Records Production

Take away (1978)
Side one
Why In The World
Down On My Knees
Lucy
Lonestar Motel
The Shape I'm In (R.Robertson)

Side two
Blame
Simple
Bonnie Lee’s Dinette
At The Funny Farm
Get On Board

Credits
Richard Jones (keyboards/vocals)
Alan Coulter (drums)
Rod Demick (bass)
Willy Finlayson (guitar/keyboards/vocals)
Keith Nelson (banjo)
Steve Simpson (guitar/violin/vocals)

References

External links
 

1970s establishments in England
1970s disestablishments in England
British country rock musical groups
Musical groups established in the 1970s
Musical groups disestablished in the 1970s